The Porotheleaceae are a family of saprotrophic, mainly wood-decay fungi in the order Agaricales that are primarily agarics, but also include cyphelloid fungi. The family had been informally cited in the literature as the 'hydropoid' clade. The type genus, Porotheleum, was placed in the phylogenetically defined clade in 2002 but the clade was more strongly supported in 2006 though without including Porotheleum. Its sister group is the Cyphellaceae, both in the 'marasmioid clade'. Some included taxa are cultivated by ants. More recently the family was recognized in three analyses that included Porotheleum.

See also
List of Agaricales families

References

 
Agaricales families